Frank Duncan may refer to:

 Frank Duncan (pitcher) (1920–1999), American baseball player in the Negro leagues from 1941 to 1945
 Frank Duncan (catcher) (1901–1973), American baseball player in the Negro leagues from 1920 to 1948
 Frank Duncan (outfielder) (1888–1958), Negro leagues outfielder and manager